The Mangaorino River is a river of the Waikato region of New Zealand's North Island.

See also
List of rivers of New Zealand

References

Rivers of Waikato
Rivers of New Zealand